Mazgit is a village in Obilić municipality.

Notes

References 

Villages in Obilić